David Raymond Paige (April 8, 1844 – June 30, 1901) was an American politician who served one term as a U.S. Representative from Ohio from 1883 to 1885.

Biography 
Born in Madison, Ohio, Paige attended the public schools and Western Reserve Academy, Hudson, Ohio.
He was graduated from Union College, Schenectady, New York, in 1865.
He engaged in the hardware business in Akron, Ohio.
Treasurer of Summit County 1875-1879.

Congress 
Paige was elected as a Democrat to the Forty-eighth Congress (March 4, 1883 – March 3, 1885).
He engaged in the contracting business.
He died in New York City June 30, 1901.
He was interred in Evergreen Cemetery, Painesville, Ohio.

Private life
Paige was married to Ellen Lewis King of Akron, January 19, 1870. She died December 20, 1877, leaving two sons. He remarried December 22, 1884 to Eva Bell Leek of Cleveland, Ohio.

References

Sources

1844 births
1901 deaths
People from Painesville, Ohio
Union College (New York) alumni
Politicians from Akron, Ohio
19th-century American politicians
People from Madison, Ohio
Western Reserve Academy alumni
Democratic Party members of the United States House of Representatives from Ohio